Germame Neway (14 August 1924 – 24 December 1960) was an Ethiopian politician known for his role in 1960 Ethiopian coup d'état attempt. He was leader of the Wolayita province, and the Somali province. Germame was a member of the aristocracy of Shewa. He died by suicide on 24 December 1960.

Background 
Of ethnic Amhara heritage. Germame was born in Addis Ababa in 1924. After his primary and secondary education in the prestigious Teferi Mekonnen School and Haile Sellassie I School in Addis Ababa, he went to the United States for further studies. He graduated with a Bachelor of Arts at Wisconsin University and Master of Arts in social science at Columbia University in 1954.

In 1958, Germame was appointed as the governor of Wolaita province, but he stayed only for one year here, and in 1959 transformed to govern the Somali Region. Also in this region, Germame led only for one year. Though he led a reform in these two places, the people opposed his administration and that put him into short term of leadership.

Coup 

Gemame became grieved for the action that taken upon him by Haile Selassie. Following this he also participated in the 1960 Ethiopian coup d'état attempt. Germame committed suicide on 24 December 1960 when he and his brother Mengistu Neway, were surrounded by the army near Mojo, Ethiopia.

References 

1924 births
1960 suicides
Ethiopian activists
Suicides by firearm in Ethiopia
Ethiopian military personnel